Cyrtandra albiflora is a species of flowering plant in the family Gesneriaceae, native to Indonesia. It is only found on Mount Hek on Sulawesi.

References

albiflora
Endemic flora of Sulawesi
Plants described in 2018